Harry D. Suitor (January 30, 1904 – March 25, 1945) was an American lawyer and politician from New York.

Life
He was born on January 30, 1904, in Chatham, Ontario, Canada. As a child he was brought to Niagara Falls, New York and was raised by John W. Broderick and his wife. He graduated from Niagara Falls High School in 1924, and from University of Buffalo Law School. He was admitted to the bar in 1930, and practiced law in partnership with Earl W. Brydges. On November 23, 1935, he married Katherine Daw, and they had two children. They resided in Youngstown, New York.

Suitor was a member of the New York State Assembly (Niagara Co., 2nd D.) from 1934 until his death in 1945, sitting in the 157th, 158th, 159th, 160th, 161st, 162nd, 163rd, 164th and 165th New York State Legislatures. He was Chairman of the Committee on Codes from 1937 to 1945.

He died on March 25, 1945, in Memorial Hospital in Niagara Falls, New York, after an embolism of the brain; and was buried at the Gate of Heaven Cemetery in Lewiston.

Sources

1904 births
1945 deaths
Politicians from Niagara Falls, New York
Republican Party members of the New York State Assembly
University at Buffalo Law School alumni
People from Chatham-Kent
20th-century American politicians
People from Youngstown, New York
Deaths from cerebral embolism
Canadian emigrants to the United States